Beta-amyrin 11-oxidase (CYP88D6) is an enzyme with systematic name beta-amyrin,NADPH:oxygen oxidoreductase (hydroxylating). This enzyme catalyses the following chemical reaction

 beta-amyrin + 2 O2 + 2 NADPH + 2 H+  11-oxo-beta-amyrin + 3 H2O + 2 NADP+ (overall reaction)
(1a) beta-amyrin + O2 + NADPH + H+  11alpha-hydroxy-beta-amyrin + H2O + NADP+
(1b) 11alpha-hydroxy-beta-amyrin + O2 + NADPH + H+  11-oxo-beta-amyrin + 2 H2O + NADP+

Beta-amyrin 11-oxidase requires cytochrome P450.

References

External links 
 

EC 1.14.13